Hwang Seon-a (born 16 September 1989) is a South Korean fencer. She earned a gold medal for South Korea in women's team sabre at the 2014 Asian Games along with teammates Kim Ji-yeon, Lee Ra-jin, and Yoon Ji-su. She participated in the women's sabre solo fencing event and the women's sabre team fencing event at the 2016 Summer Olympics.

References

External links

1989 births
Living people
South Korean female sabre fencers
Fencers at the 2016 Summer Olympics
Olympic fencers of South Korea
Fencers at the 2014 Asian Games
Fencers at the 2018 Asian Games
Asian Games gold medalists for South Korea
Asian Games medalists in fencing
Medalists at the 2014 Asian Games
Medalists at the 2018 Asian Games
Universiade medalists in fencing
Universiade silver medalists for South Korea
World Fencing Championships medalists
Medalists at the 2017 Summer Universiade
Sportspeople from North Gyeongsang Province